This is a list of lynching victims in the United States. While the definition has changed over time, lynching is often defined as the summary execution of one or more persons without due process of law by a group of people organized internally and not authorized by a legitimate government. Lynchers may claim to be issuing punishment for an alleged crime; however, they are not a judicial body nor deputized by one. Lynchings in the United States rose in number after the American Civil War in the late 19th century, following the emancipation of slaves; they declined in the 1920s. Nearly 3,500 African Americans and 1,300 whites were lynched in the United States between 1882 and 1968. Most lynchings were of African-American men in the Southern United States, but women were also lynched. More than 73 percent of lynchings in the post–Civil War period occurred in the Southern states. White lynchings of black people also occurred in the Midwestern United States and the Border States, especially during the 20th-century Great Migration of black people out of the Southern United States. The purpose was to enforce white supremacy and intimidate black people through racial terrorism.

According to Ida B. Wells and the Tuskegee University, most lynching victims were accused of murder or attempted murder. Rape or attempted rape was the second most common accusation; such accusations were often pretexts for lynching black people who violated Jim Crow etiquette or engaged in economic competition with white people. Sociologist Arthur F. Raper investigated one hundred lynchings during the 1930s and estimated that approximately one-third of the victims were falsely accused.

On a per capita basis, lynchings were also common in California and the Old West, especially of Latinos, although they represented less than 10% of the national total. Native Americans, Asian Americans and Italian-Americans were also lynched. Other ethnicities, including Finnish-Americans and German-Americans were also lynched occasionally. At least six law officers were killed trying to stop lynch mobs, three of whom succeeded at the cost of their own lives, including Deputy Sheriff Samuel Joseph Lewis in 1882, and two law officers in 1915 in South Carolina. Three law officers were themselves hanged by lynch mobs (Henry Plummer in 1864; James Murray in 1897; Carl Etherington in 1910).

19th century

20th century

1900–1909

1910–1919

1920–1929

1930–1999

21st century

See also
Lists of killings by law enforcement officers in the United States
Mass racial violence in the United States
Racism against African Americans
Racism in the United States
Red Summer
The National Memorial for Peace and Justice
Treatment of the enslaved in the United States
Jim Crow laws

Notes

Bibliography
Kentucky
References

 - Total pages: 23

References

Legal history of the United States

Lists of African-American people
Death in the United States-related lists
US lynching